Cougars, Inc., developed under the title Mother's Little Helpers and displayed in the title shot as Cougars Inc., is an American independent comedy written and directed by Asher Levin about a college-age teenager, played by Kyle Gallner, and his friends' adventures as escorts to attractive older women. The direct-to-DVD film was released May 10, 2011.

Cast
 Kyle Gallner as Sam
 Kathryn Morris as Alison
 James Belushi as Dan
 Sarah Hyland as Courtney
 Maeve Quinlan as Kitty Lowell
 Cary Alexander as Chuck
 Denise Richards as Judy
 Ryan Pinkston as Jimmy
 Rome Shadanloo as Angie
 Rebecca Mader as Mary
 Christian Murphy as Teddy

References

External links
 
 

2011 films
2011 comedy films
American independent films
American comedy films
2011 independent films
2010s English-language films
2010s American films